Drosera subg. Thelocalyx is a subgenus of two species in the genus Drosera. Both species appear to be very similar and are often confused in cultivation; both have small leaves arranged in a rosette and are annual plants. Their distributions do not overlap, however, with D. burmannii in Southeast Asia and Australia and D. sessilifolia in Brazil, Guyana, and Venezuela.

Subgenus Thelocalyx was first described by Jules Émile Planchon in 1848 and was later moved to the rank of subgenus in 1891 by Carl Georg Oscar Drude. It was later moved back to sectional rank by Rüdiger Seine and Wilhelm Barthlott in 1994. In 1996, Jan Schlauer revised the infrageneric taxonomy and supported the subgeneric rank, citing the pentamerous gynoecium and suggesting that the two species are relatively primitive with respect to other species in the genus.

See also 
List of Drosera species

References

External links 

Thelocalyx
Plant subgenera